Saunth (or sooth), is a sweet chutney used in Indian chaats. It is made from dried ginger (sooth) and tamarind (or imli) paste, hence the name.  The chutney is brownish-red in colour.

Modern sooth is often made with dates. However, sooth made with dried ginger adds a special flavour to the chaat and is preferred in most parts of North India.

See also
 List of chutneys

References

External links
 Recipe

North Indian cuisine
Uttar Pradeshi cuisine
Indian fast food
Indian condiments
Chutney